The 1906 Washington football team was an American football team that represented the University of Washington during the 1906 college football season. In its first season under coach Victor M. Place, the team compiled a 4–1–4 record and outscored its opponents by a combined total of 49 to 35. Owen Crim was the team captain.

Schedule

References

Washington
Washington Huskies football seasons
Washington football